Gunnar Hans Nordbye (February 4, 1888 – November 5, 1977) was a United States district judge of the United States District Court for the District of Minnesota.

Education and career

Nordbye was born at Urskog (spelled Aurskog since 1918) in Akershus, Norway. He was the son of Halvor Olsen Nordbye (1850–1894) and Anna Kristine Aarnæs (1856–1940). Nordbye received a Bachelor of Laws from the University of Minnesota Law School in 1912. He was in private practice in Minneapolis, Minnesota from 1912 to 1922. He was a Judge of the Municipal Court of Minneapolis from 1922 to 1925, and of the Fourth Judicial District Court of Minnesota from 1925 to 1931.

Federal judicial service

Nordbye received a recess appointment from President Herbert Hoover on March 18, 1931, to the United States District Court for the District of Minnesota, to a new seat authorized by 46 Stat. 431. He was nominated to the same position by President Hoover on December 16, 1931. He was confirmed by the United States Senate on February 3, 1932, and received his commission on February 10, 1932. He served as Chief Judge from 1948 to 1959. He was a member of the Judicial Conference of the United States from 1958 to 1962. He assumed senior status on March 6, 1967. He was the last federal judge in active service to have been appointed by President Hoover. His service terminated on November 5, 1977, due to his death.

References

Sources
 

1888 births
1977 deaths
Minnesota state court judges
Judges of the United States District Court for the District of Minnesota
United States district court judges appointed by Herbert Hoover
20th-century American judges
Lawyers from Minneapolis
University of Minnesota Law School alumni
People from Aurskog-Høland
Norwegian emigrants to the United States